Bölsberg is an Ortsgemeinde – a community belonging to a Verbandsgemeinde – in the Westerwaldkreis in Rhineland-Palatinate, Germany.

Geography

The community lies in the Westerwald between Limburg and Siegen. Bölsberg is the smallest community in the Verbandsgemeinde of Bad Marienberg, a kind of collective municipality. Its seat is in the like-named town.

History
About 1300, Bölsberg had its first documentary mention.

Politics

The municipal council is made up of 6 council members who were elected in a majority vote in a municipal election on 7 June 2009.

Economy and infrastructure

Transport
North of the community runs Bundesstraße 414 leading from Driedorf-Hohenroth to Hachenburg. The nearest Autobahn interchange is Haiger/Burbach on the A 45 (Dortmund–Hanau), some 25 km away. The nearest InterCityExpress stop is the railway station at Montabaur on the Cologne-Frankfurt high-speed rail line.

References

External links
 Bölsberg in the collective municipality’s Web pages 

Municipalities in Rhineland-Palatinate
Westerwaldkreis